Juan Soriano Oropesa (born 23 August 1997) is a Spanish professional footballer who plays for CD Tenerife as a goalkeeper.

Club career

Sevilla
Born in Benacazón, Province of Seville, Andalusia, Soriano joined Sevilla FC's youth setup in 2009 at the age of 12, from Real Betis. He was called up by first-team manager Unai Emery during the 2014–15 campaign, and appeared as a substitute in a 2–0 home win against Feyenoord in the group stage of the UEFA Europa League.

Soriano renewed his contract on 13 May 2016, until 2019. He made his professional debut on 21 August, starting in the 3–3 Segunda División home draw with Girona FC.

On 5 July 2018, Soriano agreed to an extension until 2022 and was promoted to the main squad in La Liga. Benefitting from injury to starter Tomáš Vaclík, he played his first match in the competition on 10 March 2019 in a 5–2 home rout of Real Sociedad.

On 5 July 2019, Soriano was loaned to fellow top-tier side CD Leganés for one year. On 28 September of the following year, he moved to Málaga CF in the second division also in a temporary deal.

Tenerife
Soriano joined CD Tenerife as a free agent on 17 June 2021, on a three-year deal.

Career statistics

References

External links

1997 births
Living people
People from Aljarafe
Sportspeople from the Province of Seville
Spanish footballers
Footballers from Andalusia
Association football goalkeepers
La Liga players
Segunda División players
Sevilla Atlético players
Sevilla FC players
CD Leganés players
Málaga CF players
CD Tenerife players
Spain youth international footballers
Spain under-21 international footballers